Sophiini is a tribe of bristle flies in the family Tachinidae.

Genera
Cordyligaster Macquart, 1844
Cryptosophia De Santis, 2018
Euantha Wulp, 1885
Euanthoides Townsend, 1931
Leptidosophia Townsend, 1931
Neoeuantha Townsend, 1931
Neosophia Guimarães, 1982
Sophia Robineau-Desvoidy, 1830
Sophiella Guimarães, 1982

References

Brachycera tribes
Dexiinae
Diptera of North America
Diptera of South America